Lance William Key (born 13 May 1968) is an English former footballer, who played as a goalkeeper. His elder brother Richard was also a professional goalkeeper principally for Exeter City and Cambridge United.

Key is also a football coach; he is currently employed as the manager of Histon.

Career
Born in Kettering, Northamptonshire, Key began his professional career in April 1990 when he joined Sheffield Wednesday from non-league Histon for a fee of £10,000. He spent six years with Wednesday, but made just one appearance, as a substitute in the FA Cup at Gillingham. This followed the sending off of Kevin Pressman. Key's first touch was to pick the ball out of the net following the penalty which led to the sending off.

Loan spells with Oldham Athletic, Oxford United, Lincoln City, Hartlepool United and Rochdale followed before a free transfer move to Dundee United in July 1996.

At Tannadice, Key was understudy to regular keeper Ally Maxwell and made his debut on 2 November 1996 in a 3–1 win away to Motherwell. He played twice more later that month, and after a horrendous error against Dunfermline Athletic  returned to England in March 1997 without making any further first team appearances, joining Sheffield United on a free transfer.

In August 1997 he joined Rochdale on a free transfer. He moved to Northwich Victoria on loan in December 1998, with the move being made permanent in February 1999.

He moved to Kingstonian in June 2001 and rejoined Histon in September 2004, where he helped the team to Southern League and Conference South championships. He left Histon in September 2008 and joined Wivenhoe Town, but left the club after just one FA Vase appearance. In July 2010 he joined Rushden & Diamonds as goalkeeping coach. He was released by the club in May 2011.

Managerial career 
Key was appointed manager of Histon on 7 October 2016, replacing Steve Fallon.

References

External links

1968 births
Sportspeople from Kettering
Living people
English footballers
Sheffield Wednesday F.C. players
Oldham Athletic A.F.C. players
Oxford United F.C. players
Lincoln City F.C. players
Hartlepool United F.C. players
Rochdale A.F.C. players
Dundee United F.C. players
Sheffield United F.C. players
Northwich Victoria F.C. players
Kingstonian F.C. players
Altrincham F.C. players
Histon F.C. players
Wivenhoe Town F.C. players
Rushden & Diamonds F.C. players
Premier League players
English Football League players
Scottish Football League players
National League (English football) players
English football managers
Histon F.C. managers
Association football goalkeepers